The Nobody Safe Tour was a headlining concert tour by American rapper, Future, in support of his  eponymous album (2017). The tour began in Memphis on May 4, 2017, and concluded in Las Vegas on June 30, 2017.

Background
On February 14, 2017, the rapper teased his eponymous album set for release on February 17, 2017. With the teaser was also an announcement of a spring tour. Migos, Tory Lanez, Kodak Black, Young Thug, and ASAP Ferg were announced as opening acts for tour. It wasn't until Kodak Black was guilty of five counts of house arrest stipulation which caused him to be removed from the lineup. Zoey Dollaz replaced Kodak Black and A Boogie wit da Hoodie opened in select dates.

Tour dates

Cancelled shows

Notes

References

2017 concert tours